David Pierce is an American businesses man, he is most known for being the former CEO of Atari, Inc.

Corporate history
 Former CEO of Atari (appointed September 5, 2006).

 Sony Wonder executive VP/GM
 Sony Music Entertainment
 Sony Pictures Entertainment
 Metro-Goldwyn-Mayer
 Universal Pictures

References

Place of birth missing (living people)
Living people
Atari people
1972 births